U of I Community Credit Union (UICCU) is a federally insured credit union based in Champaign, Illinois. They currently have 3 branches in Champaign–Urbana, Illinois and serve the University of Illinois campus and surrounding communities.

History
U of I Community Credit Union began in October 1932 as "Our Credit Union", founded by Mr. E.W. Eubanks. They served University of Illinois hourly employees through a janitor's room at the U of I Power Plant. By the end of their first year, they had a total of 37 members and $116.97 in assets. Three years later they moved off campus to a location in Urbana, they expanded their membership to include faculty, and they changed their name to University of Illinois Employees Credit Union (UIECU).

In 1954, Glen Pickens became the first full-time employee of UIECU. By the end of the following year, their assets had grown to $1,000,000.

In 1968, UIECU began the Illinois Guaranteed Loan Program in order to help members acquire loans for their children's college tuition. In 1973, they began offering payroll deduction. Soon after, they added share draft checking accounts, certificates, IRAs, second mortgages, and money market accounts.

U of I students became eligible for membership at UIECU in 1998 when the Illini Student Federal Credit Union merged with UIECU. In addition, employees of telecommunications businesses became eligible for membership in 1999 when Champaign Bell Credit Union merged with UIECU.

Online banking became available for members of UIECU in 2000. During this time, UIECU had record years for mortgages and new member growth. UIECU was named the #1 source for local auto lending in Champaign–Urbana in 2006, in addition to the Mortgage Department being awarded the "Best of the Best" award from PHH Mortgage Services.

In 2015, UIECU changed their name to U of I Community Credit Union in order to reflect their commitment to serving the U of I campus and surrounding communities.

Membership
U of I Community Credit Union membership is open to anyone who lives or works in the following counties: Champaign, Ford, Piatt, Douglas, and Vermilion.

Also eligible for membership are:
 UIUC, UIC, and UIS employees
 University of Illinois Urbana-Champaign students
 Family members of current UICCU members
 International Brotherhood of Electrical Workers Local 601 members
 University of Illinois Research Park

References

External links
 U of I Community Credit Union Official Website

Banks established in 1932
Credit unions based in Illinois
University of Illinois Urbana-Champaign